Alfredo Carnovali (born 21 June 1937) is an Argentine water polo player. He competed in the men's tournament at the 1960 Summer Olympics.

References

1937 births
Living people
Argentine male water polo players
Olympic water polo players of Argentina
Water polo players at the 1960 Summer Olympics
Sportspeople from Buenos Aires